is a Japanese manga artist widely known for the Saiyuki series.

Biography
She was born in Kanagawa-ken, and still resides there. Her blood type is A. Her other manga series include Wild Adapter, Shiritsu Araiso Koto Gakko Seitokai Shikkobu (Araiso Private School Student Council Executive Committee), and Stigma. Stigma is notable for being a full-color work, unusual as manga is generally drawn in black and white. Minekura portrays herself as a naked chibi character with brown hair, in the Artist's Talk section of her mangas. She had an illness that affected her writing from 2004–2007, which caused her to have a hysterectomy. On 28 September 2010, she went on Hiatus to undergo surgery for ameloblastoma on the right half of her upper jawbone. On 31 December 2010, she reported her surgery was successful after removing the tumor on her right upper jawbone and is currently resting and being fitted with artificial prosthetics to reconstruct the area where her bones were removed.
She resumed her manga Wild Adapter in 2015. On 16 April 2021, Minekura revealed that she had been diagnosed with spinal canal stenosis. Minekura also said that she had also been suffering from multiple medical problems.

Before becoming a professional she created doujinshi, of the original genre. Everything that she created from her time as a doujinshi artist turned into her major works that she is known for today. She wrote the scripts for the drama CD's produced of her works, and wrote the lyrics for the opening theme in Saiyuki Reload Burial.

Her works involve fantasy, school, and the hard boiled genres. Most of her works involve action. She has a fixation with her depiction of the male body, and friendship relationships. As a lover of smoking, many of the character that appear in her works are smokers(she herself smokes CABIN Super Mild). Her works involve a lot of violence, and grotesque scenes. Her characters also use dirty jokes often. She uses a lot of shadow screen tones, one example is the hard boiled genre work BUS GAMER. She uses copic markers when coloring, but recently uses CG as well.

Selected works
 Saiyuki 
 Saiyuki Reload 
 Saiyuki Reload Blast
 Saiyuki Gaiden
 Saiyuki Ibun 
 Wild Adapter
 Just!
 Stigma
 Brother
 Diorama 
 Bus Gamer
 Shiritsu Araiso Koto Gakko Seitokai Shikkobu (Araiso Private High School Student Council Executive Committee)
 
HARD LUCK (cover art)

Art books 

 Back gammon 1～3
 Back gammon-Remix
 sugar coat
 salty dog 1～10
 sugar coat excess

References

1975 births
Living people
Women manga artists
Manga artists from Kanagawa Prefecture
Japanese female comics artists
Female comics writers
Japanese women writers
Japanese writers